Bokermannohyla flavopicta is a frog in the family Hylidae endemic to southeastern Brazil.  Scientists have seen it exclusively over 1500 meters above sea level.

The adult male frog measures 51.9–65.3 mm in snout-vent length and the adult female frog 60.2–61.6 mm.  The skin on the dorsum has a gray or brown background with darker brown irregular marks.  It has small yellow spots on its lips, face, flanks, front and hind legs, front and hind feet, and cloacal area.

References

Species described in 2012
Frogs of South America
flavopicta